Ambit or AMBIT may refer to:

Ambit (magazine), a literary magazine
AMBIT, a family of pattern matching programming languages
AMBIT (Adolescent Mentalization-Based Integrative Treatment), a form of therapy
Ubee Interactive (formerly Ambit Broadband), a producer of cable modem, ADSL, and IPTV products
Ambit claim, an extravagant initial demand made in expectation of an eventual counter-offer and compromise
Ambit Energy, a U.S. electricity and natural gas provider